Clifton Springs is a coastal town located on the Bellarine Peninsula, near Geelong, Victoria, Australia.

History
In December 1870 a report was published regarding the discovery of mineral springs
on "Clifton", the property of Thomas Bates (Jnr). The medicinal value of the waters was submitted to rigid chemical examination, and summarised as containing magnesia, seltzer, sulphur, soda and iron.

In about 1871, Bates leased the land adjacent to the Springs to Mr. Levien, a large landholder at nearby Murradoc, who created a pleasure ground, and Clifton Springs boomed. A pier was built, along with salt water and sulphur baths. Steamers ran excursions from Geelong and other places, and regular coach services were provided by Cobb & Co. from nearby Portarlington and Drysdale. Other buildings, including a boiler house, mineral water bottling plant, kiosk, and manager's cottage were built in the vicinity of what became known as "Fairy Dell".

A well-appointed hotel was constructed above the Springs. It was destroyed by fire in 1921, and a second one was built in 1926, which was remodelled as the Clifton Springs Country Club in about 1957, as part of a real estate development, and became the Clifton Springs Community Centre in 1977 when the building was purchased by the then Shire of Bellarine.

A Clifton Springs Post Office was open from 1902 until 1921, and from 1927 until 1932. Fairy Dell Post Office opened on 1 July 1916 and closed in 1971.

The springs area, located around Fairy Dell, was closed due to possible landslides, but was re-opened in 2007 after extensive work to repair the area.

The former Mineral Springs site on Spring Street is listed on the Victorian Heritage Register.

Town overview

Clifton Springs, often grouped with its neighbouring town, Drysdale, overlooks Corio Bay, the You Yangs and Geelong. This combined urban area had an estimated population of 13,494 at June 2016. The area has undergone significant changes over the past decade, with new housing developments on the north side of the town.

In the early 1960s, as part of a large real estate development in Clifton Springs, which they dubbed "Clifton Springs and Country Club Estate", real estate agents Willmore and Randell erected a striking entrance structure in Bayshore Avenue. The structure included a fountain, which eventually passed to the control of the Greater Geelong Council. The fountain has degraded over time, and in late 2006 it was emptied until further notice, due to water restrictions.

In 2013 a Clifton Springs fountain working group reported that locals wanted something done about the fountain's gradual deterioration. They felt it has been neglected for too long and were concerned that it was becoming an eyesore. A public meeting on 12 March expressed general support for renovating the structure, using an enclosed, non-evaporative system which would use much less water. The renovation should include symbols of the area’s past and possible futures, linking the fountain with some of the public art at The Dell, and evoking the time when mineral water was exported from Clifton Springs.

Local councillor Lindsay Ellis told the working group that a report on the fountain's condition, with an estimate of the cost of refurbishing it, was due from council officers on 23 April, and that Geelong Council would consider the fountain's future as part of the process of formulating the council's 2013/14 budget.

The Clifton Springs Golf Club is entered from Clearwater Drive.

Clifton Springs Primary School was established in 1989 and is situated in Jetty Road. It has an enrolment of approximately 400 students.

The town has a modest cult profile amongst fans of the UK comedy, The Inbetweeners.  In episode 1 of series 1, Jay Cartwright attempts to buy drinks in a pub whilst underage using a fake ID.  He uses the Victorian Driver Licence of Bret Clement, whose address is shown as Whitcombes Road, Clifton Springs, and an incredibly poor, but probably internationally recognisable Australian accent.  He fails.

Census populations 
 1911 – 50
 1966 – 146
 1976 – 1,049
 1986 – 3,657
 1991 – 5,847
 2006 – 7,063
 2011 – 7,153
 2016 – 7,519

In the 2016 Census, there were 7,519 people in Clifton Springs. 79.4% of people were born in Australia. The next most common country of birth was England at 5.8%.  91.1% of people spoke only English at home. The most common responses for religion were No Religion 35.4%, Catholic 22.8% and Anglican 13.5%.

The population is expected to grow to more than 9,000 residents by the year 2020.

Gallery

References

External links
Clifton Springs - City of Greater Geelong
Australian Places - Clifton Springs

Suburbs of Geelong
Coastal towns in Victoria (Australia)
Towns in Victoria (Australia)
Bellarine Peninsula